Victoria Azarenka was the defending champion, but withdrew because of a right knee injury.

World No. 1 Serena Williams won the title, defeating Ana Ivanovic in the final, 6–4, 6–1.

Seeds
The top eight seeds received a bye into the second round.

Draw

Finals

Top half

Section 1

Section 2

Bottom half

Section 3

Section 4

Qualifying

Seeds

Qualifiers

Lucky losers
  Mona Barthel

Qualifying draw

First qualifier

Second qualifier

Third qualifier

Fourth qualifier

Fifth qualifier

Sixth qualifier

Seventh qualifier

Eighth qualifier

Ninth qualifier

Tenth qualifier

Eleventh qualifier

Twelfth qualifier

References
Main Draw
Qualifying Draw

Western and Southern Open
2014 Western & Southern Open